New Lyme Township is one of the twenty-seven townships of Ashtabula County, Ohio, United States. The 2010 census found 1,116 people in the township.

Geography
Located in the southern part of the county, it borders the following townships:
Lenox Township - north
Dorset Township - northeast corner
Cherry Valley Township - east
Wayne Township - southeast corner
Colebrook Township - south
Orwell Township - southwest corner
Rome Township - west
Morgan Township - northwest corner

No municipalities are located in New Lyme Township.

Name and history
It is the only New Lyme Township statewide.

The township was first settled by former Connecticut resident Joel Owen in 1803.

The township was originally known as Lebanon until 1825, when it was renamed for Lyme, Connecticut, the former home of many of its early settlers.

Government
The township is governed by a three-member board of trustees, who are elected in November of odd-numbered years to a four-year term beginning on the following January 1. Two are elected in the year after the presidential election and one is elected in the year before it. There is also an elected township fiscal officer, who serves a four-year term beginning on April 1 of the year after the election, which is held in November of the year before the presidential election. Vacancies in the fiscal officership or on the board of trustees are filled by the remaining trustees.  Currently, the board is composed of chairman Christopher Zaebst and members William Edelman and Lee Fetters.

References

External links
Township website
County website

Townships in Ashtabula County, Ohio
Townships in Ohio